Little Bear is a Canadian children's animated series produced by Nelvana Limited in association with the Canadian Broadcasting Corporation. It is based on the Little Bear series of books, which were written by Else Holmelund Minarik and illustrated by Maurice Sendak. In the United States, the show premiered on Nickelodeon as part of the Nick Jr. block on November 6, 1995 until the final episode aired on June 1, 2001. The show also aired on CBS on Saturday mornings from September 16, 2000 until September 15, 2001.

Every half-hour episode of Little Bear is divided into three seven-minute segments. Most segments are new stories, but some are retellings of Else Holmelund Minarik's books (both she and Sendak were "closely involved in the creative process" when developing the new stories).

A direct-to-video feature film titled The Little Bear Movie was released in 2001.

Plot

Set in the North American wilderness around the end of the 19th century, Little Bear goes on exciting adventures and learns new things with his friends Emily, Duck, Hen, Cat, and Owl. Mother Bear is a homemaker who looks after Little Bear, while Father Bear, a fisherman, is typically away on his ship, fishing.

Episodes

Characters

Main
Little Bear (voiced by Kristin Fairlie) is a six-year-old small, curious, and imaginative grizzly bear cub who lives in the forest with his family and friends. Throughout the series, he has grown somewhat, as his voice is slightly deeper, and he rarely takes naps. He is the only character whose parents are shown other than Duck's mother in one episode, who is a chicken, as well as Emily's parents briefly in the episode where they met. Little Bear lives in a stucco, wood, plaster and brick house. He is always kind and loves to play and explore with his friends. His catchphrase is "Hmmmm... Interesting!"
Emily (voiced by Jennifer Martini) is a seven-year-old little girl who is Little Bear's best friend. She carries around a doll named Lucy everywhere she goes and is very attached to her. In the summer, Emily vacations with her parents by the river near Little Bear's home. Emily eventually moves to the forest permanently and lives there with her grandmother. 
Owl (voiced by Amos Crawley) is a male owl who is sometimes pompous, yet very sensible. He lives in a treehouse, and can be quite serious at times. Although Owl enjoys fun games, he will only participate if the gameplay is logical and rational; reading is his main hobby.
Duck (voiced by Tracy Ryan) is a female duck with yellow feathers, an orange beak, and a long neck. Slow and smart at the same time, Duck is one who gets herself into comical situations. She lives in a nest, although in one episode, she expressed longing for a house and tried to live in a houseboat. It floated downriver filled with frogs and Duck lived happily in her nest. She loves playing "princess" and pretend. She was hatched in a nest of chicks, because "some eggs got mixed up", and Little Bear taught her to fly when she was a duckling. Although Duck never has any ducklings of her own, she is sometimes seen babysitting a group of them.
Cat (voiced by Andrew Sabiston) is a laidback, slothful male cat who enjoys prowling at night, playing tricks on passersby, and eating. When his friends and he must get to a certain place in the woods, Cat often leads them through one of his shortcuts. His catchphrase is "Boo!"
Hen (voiced by Elizabeth Hanna) is a fussy, feisty chicken who lives in a large chicken coop. She is classy and sophisticated, and enjoys cleanliness, though her several nieces and nephews often mess up her spotless house. However, she never turns down the opportunity for fun. Hen has also been shown to be fond of opera, but she seems to be not good at singing it.
Mother Bear (voiced by Janet-Laine Green) is Little Bear's mother. She enjoys cooking and is always there to help Little Bear if he needs it. She also seems to be very tidy and does not like it when the house becomes messy. She normally wears a pink shirt and a blue skirt with a white apron.
Father Bear (voiced by Dan Hennessey) is Little Bear's father and Mother Bear's husband. His occupation is a fisherman and sometimes takes Little Bear out fishing. He has been to many places and likes to keep things that are old, even if they have to be thrown away. He usually wears a blue suit with a purple tie and brown shoes. Throughout the run of the show, he is sporadically absent, as he is away, fishing.

Recurring
No Feet (voiced by Rick Jones) is a friendly, gentle, green male garter snake that lives in Mother Bear's garden. Little Bear gets along with him very well.
Grandmother Bear (voiced by Diane D'Aquila) is Little Bear's maternal grandmother and Mother Bear's mother, and Grandfather Bear's wife. She likes to cook and tell stories.
Grandfather Bear (voiced by Sean McCann) is Little Bear's maternal grandfather and Mother Bear's father. He once worked at a circus with his wife and sister. He wears a green suit coat, but with khaki slacks and a dark red tie with brown shoes.
Rusty Bear (voiced by Dan Lett) is Father Bear's younger brother and Little Bear's uncle. He mentions that he lives in the woods and that he would prefer to live there because it is quiet and peaceful. He is a very large bear, slightly taller and huskier than Father Bear. He has a deep voice, wears overalls, and has a red handkerchief around his neck. He is only seen in a few of the Little Bear episodes. Little Bear is fascinated with Rusty's outdoor ethic, and whenever he shows up, Little Bear is tempted to emulate his rustic character.
Granny (voiced by Kay Hawtrey) is Emily's grandmother, with whom she and her parents live with in the summer and then permanently, has traveled the world, and has many odd pieces of furniture. She is the owner of Tutu.
Tutu (voiced by Tara Strong) is Emily and Granny's dog. She acts very hyper and she can understand humans. According to Granny, she only speaks French, yet she understands English.
Mitzi (voiced by Ashley Taylor) is a five-year-old, mischievous, sometimes rather unthoughtful, tomboyish monkey, who lives in a treehouse in the forest around Little Bear's home. She feels bad after slighting somebody's feelings or misleading them. She sometimes has green or white eyes. Mitzi is the last to join the supporting cast, not appearing until the end of season two.
Moose (voiced by Ray Landry) is a male eastern moose, who sometimes helps Little Bear and his friends when they are in need.
Mermaid is a mermaid whom Little Bear occasionally meets when he goes to the lake. She is friendly and takes Little Bear to see places underwater. Owl and Emily have also met Mermaid.

Others
Four northern river otter siblings sporadically appear; they reside in the local river and are balloon heads. They are frequent in episodes focusing on water activities.
Frog is a male frog that dispenses zen-like wisdom between his meditations. He resides at Little Bear's favourite swimming spot, Hop-Frog Pond. He is also very wise, and a good friend to Little Bear.
Little Ick  is a baby raccoon who only appears in an episode where his mother went to visit his grandmother and dropped him off with Mother Bear. Little Bear and Little Ick form a bit of a sibling relationship together, such as Little Bear feeling left out because Mother Bear seems to be paying more attention to Little Ick. Little Ick is the baby raccoon's nickname from Little Bear because "Ick" is the only thing the baby can say.
Marshmallow  is a baby white skunk who is found by Owl and Little Bear in an episode, and she plays with Duck, Little Bear, Owl, and Cat in the episode "Little Footprints". In the episode "The Wedding", she is the flower girl in Mr. and Mrs. Skunk's wedding.
Mighty is a humpback whale who is an old friend of Father Bear's. He appears in the episode "A Whale of a Tale" where Father Bear takes Little Bear fishing. He tells Little Bear the story of how he met Mighty when he accidentally caught him in his fishing net. A storm appears and Mighty and his son, Little Whale, help pull Father Bear and Little Bear back to shore. Mighty also appears in Little Bear's dream in the episode "Fisherman Bear's Big Catch". Although he only appears in a few episodes, Mighty is in the opening credits of the show.
Mr. Wind (voiced by Sean McCann) is a cloud. He is the cold, angry wind that blows down from the north. He speaks English with an English accent.

Telecast and home media
The show premiered on Nickelodeon as part of Nick Jr. block in 1995 until the final episode aired in 2001 in the United States. The show was also aired on CBS on Saturday mornings from September 16, 2000 until September 8, 2001. Nickelodeon's sister channel Noggin (now Nick Jr.) aired repeats from 2001 to 2018. In Canada, CBC aired the show in the 1990s until the early 2000s. Also, Corus-owned Treehouse TV formerly aired the show. It has been re-aired on various foreign channels, including ABC and ABC2 (Australia), RTÉ (Ireland), TV2 (New Zealand) and Children's BBC (United Kingdom).

Streaming
On December 15, 2014, Treehouse TV released all seasons of the show, as well as the movie, free to watch on the Official Little Bear YouTube channel.

In 2015, Little Bear was added to Nickelodeon's Noggin app in the United States.

The show was added to Paramount+ (which was called CBS All Access at the time) in January 2021.

VHS
Meet Little Bear (1997)
Family Tales (1997)
Winter Tales (1997)
Parties & Picnics (1998)
Goodnight Little Bear (1998)
Friends (1999)
Summertime Tales (1999)
Little Goblin Bear (1999)
A Kiss for Little Bear (2000)
Little Bear's Band (2000)
Rainy Day Tales (2000)
Little Sherlock Bear (2001)
The Little Bear Movie (2001)
Let's Play a Game (2001)
Little Artist Bear (2002)
Campfire Tales (2002)
Snacktime Tales (2002)
Feel Better, Little Bear (2003)

DVD
Canadian releases:
Outdoor Fun (2002)
Mysterious Moments (2002) 
Hooray for Little Bear (2002)
At Home (2003)
Dreams and Make Believe (2006)
Mother and Father Bear (2006) 
Exploring and Other Adventures (2006)
Seasons (2005) Slim case
New Friends (2005) Slim case
Parties and Picnics (2005) Slim case
Grandmother's House (2005) Slim case
Tales for Rainy Days (2009) Slim case
Meet Mitzi (2009) Slim case

2012 release by Treehouse
Seaside Adventures
Summer Sandcastles
Search for Spring
Dress Up Time
Mother Bear's Special Day
Follow the Leader
Winter Games
Father's Day

U.S. releases:
The Little Bear Movie (August 7, 2001)
Feel Better, Little Bear (October 7, 2003)
Rainy Day Tales (June 7, 2005)
Little Bear's Band (June 7, 2005)
Halloween Stories (August 22, 2006)

Film
In 2001, the show was adapted into a direct-to-video film, again produced by Nelvana, called The Little Bear Movie. It was distributed by Paramount Home Entertainment in the U.S. The film's featured song, "Great Big World", was nominated for Best Original Song at the 2001 Video Premiere Awards.

Music
Austrian composer Franz Schubert's Allegro vivace from his Violin Sonata No. 1 in D Major is used as the theme tune to Little Bear (used in the Canadian broadcast of the series). The theme was arranged for brass, wind, and strings by composer Arnold Black. A separate opening theme consisting of a classical woodwind ensemble was used in the American broadcast of the series. The music score in the series is composed by Lesley Barber. There are also excerpts of works by composers Chopin, Haydn, Bach and Mozart.

Other media

Live show
In Canada, Little Bear was adapted into a live theatrical show, Little Bear: Winter Tales. It originally toured across Canada in 2007 and returned in late 2009. Both tours were presented by Paquin Entertainment, and were produced by Koba Entertainment.

Video games
In 1999, The Learning Company developed two "edutainment" games based on the Little Bear franchise, "Rainy Day Activities" and "Preschool Thinking Adventures". In 2000, the company developed another game, this time for a younger audience, titled "Toddler Discovery Adventures".

References

External links
 

1990s Canadian animated television series
1990s Canadian children's television series
1995 Canadian television series debuts
2000s Canadian animated television series
2000s Canadian children's television series
2001 Canadian television series endings
Canadian children's animated adventure television series
Canadian children's animated supernatural television series
Canadian television shows based on children's books
Television series by Nelvana
Animated television series about bears
Animated television series about children
Animated television series about families
CBC Kids original programming
Nick Jr. original programming
Treehouse TV original programming
Nickelodeon original programming
Canadian preschool education television series
Animated preschool education television series
1990s preschool education television series
2000s preschool education television series
English-language television shows